Blackwater Dam is a dam in the town of Webster, Merrimack County, New Hampshire.

It impounds the Blackwater River for flood control and storm water management as one of five related projects in the Merrimack River basin. The dam is owned and operated by the New England District, North Atlantic Division, Army Corps of Engineers.

The site includes  of river popular for canoeing and kayaking, and fishing for brown and rainbow trout.

References 

Dams in New Hampshire
Reservoirs in New Hampshire
United States Army Corps of Engineers dams
Dams completed in 1941
Buildings and structures in Merrimack County, New Hampshire
Landforms of Merrimack County, New Hampshire
Webster, New Hampshire